The 2016 UIPM Senior World Championships were held in Moscow, Russia from 23 to 29 May 2016. The event includes pistol shooting, fencing, 200m swimming, show jumping and a 3km run.

Medal summary

Men

  Russian team originally won silver medals but was disqualified due to anti-doping rules violation by Maksim Kustov.

Women

Mixed

Medal table

See also
 Union Internationale de Pentathlon Moderne (UIPM)

References

External links
 Results

 
World
World Modern Pentathlon Championships
Modern pentathlon competitions in Russia
Modern pentathlon in Europe
Sports competitions in Moscow
May 2016 sports events in Russia